Feminist perspectives on sex markets vary widely, depending on the type of feminism being applied. The sex market is defined as the system of supply and demand which is generated by the existence of sex work as a commodity. The sex market can further be segregated into the direct sex market, which mainly applies to prostitution, and the indirect sex market, which applies to sexual businesses which provide services such as lap dancing. The final component of the sex market lies in the production and selling of pornography. With the distinctions between feminist perspectives, there are many documented instances from feminist authors of both explicit and implied feminist standpoints that provide coverage on the sex market in regards to both "autonomous" and "non-autonomous" sex trades. The quotations are added since some feminist ideology believe the commodification of women's bodies is never autonomous and therefore subversive or misleading by terminology.

Feminist responses to sex market

Radical feminism 
Radical feminism views prostitution, and by extension the sex market, as the ideal demonstration of women being subordinated and subjected to violence through the patriarchy's market demands. The notable radical feminist Andrea Dworkin argues that the sexual subordination of women must be overcome for gender equality to be achieved. The sex market, which renders the woman's body a commodity, is therefore incompatible with radical feminism. Some radical feminists argue that the sex market, by breaking down the barrier between sexual activity against commercialization and production, degrades the sexual autonomy women socially hold. The lack of autonomy in the sex market stems from the inhumane treatment sex workers often face, the social and economic power discrepancy between the consumers and providers of sexual services and content, and the perpetuation of the subordination of women through the sex market's high demand. This falls in line with the view radical feminists hold about capitalist societies as containing a 'moral' economy, in which the economically permitted actions embodies societal beliefs about individual autonomy. Within the framework of moral appeals, the sex market meets its unambiguous and nondiscretionary fulfillment of its obligations to consumers at the expense of female sexual autonomy.

Liberal feminism 
Liberal feminism views a capitalist democracy as capable and inclined to enacting laws which protect individual rights as it pertains to gender discrimination, and this includes protecting women who work within sex markets.  As the feminist author Martha Nussbaum argues, the reason that sex markets see such high instances of undermined female autonomy and sexual wellness is due to the social stigmatization which is rooted in the fear of female sexual expression, and that the services of the sex market should be respected as any other form of labor. Nussbaum's argument concludes that the stigmatization of sex markets only directly negatively impacts sex workers without addressing the underlying social oppression towards women. There is disagreement between liberal feminists as to whether or not sex work is degrading to women, but it is generally agreed upon that legalizing the sex market would be positive, as it would grant women who work within the sex market greater protections under the legal system. This would come in the form of granting women safer spaces to work, and allow the government to limit and regulate unsafe, exploitative practices against sex workers. The legalization of sex work also grants sex workers the autonomy to decide what they wish to do with their bodies, which is a tenant of liberal feminism.

Dominance feminism 
Dominance feminism views the political, social, and economic structure of the world are discriminatory against women on account of the concerted efforts of the patriarchy, and therefore the discrimination against women in the sex markets manifests as a byproduct of male domination. As the dominance feminist author Catharine A. MacKinnon holds, the sex market cannot be viewed as feminist on account of men's sexual domination over women being the main factor upon which the market functions. Prostitution and the sex market is viewed more broadly as a state which all women are involuntarily entered into due to a woman's sexuality being the object through which men can barter and legislate over. Due to the nature of the sex market as primarily selling female produced content or female bodies, which are often sold to men as clients through male brokers, prostitution and pornography are the highest forms of women's exploitation. Dominance feminists might also view prostitution as inherently negative due to the belief that women's self-expression through sexuality cannot ever be sold without the patron's perception of the commodity as being discriminatory against female autonomy.

Sex market across the world

Netherlands: Amsterdam 

The notable neighborhood of De Wallen in Amsterdam is home to the Netherlands' legalized red-light district, which is a commercial hub for the sex market. Through the legalization and regulation of the sex market, the Dutch government has been capable of cutting back on organized crime within the red-light district without encroaching on the rights of sex workers, who are still protected by the law. Although the intentions are politically well meaning, most projections for the decriminalization projects of the region are projected to displace and therefore endanger sex workers, which seems to prove the point liberal feminists make about stigmatization on a governmental level as endangering to prostitutes.

See also
 Decriminalization of sex work
 Individualist feminism
 Prostitution law
 Sex-positive feminism
 Sex workers' rights

References 

Feminist theory
Feminism and prostitution
Feminism and sexuality